Manoël Dall'igna (born 12 March 1985) is a French rugby sevens forward who competed at the 2016 Olympics.

References

1985 births
Living people
Rugby sevens players at the 2016 Summer Olympics
Olympic rugby sevens players of France
France international rugby sevens players